This is a list of Utah suffragists, suffrage groups and others associated with the cause of women's suffrage in Utah.

Groups 
 Colored Women's Republican Club.
 Female Relief Society of Nauvoo, created in 1842.
 Utah Council of Women.
 Woman Suffrage Association of Farmington.
 Woman Suffrage Association of Glenwood.
 Woman Suffrage Association of Utah.

Suffragists 

 Phebe Y. Beattie.
 Margaret N. Caine.
 George Q. Cannon.
 Martha Hughes Cannon.
 Lucy A. Clark.
 Margaret Zane Cherdron.
 Elizabeth M. Cohen.
 Marilla M. Daniels.
 Maria Y. Dougall.
 Julia P. M. Farnsworth.
 Ruth May Fox.
 Elizabeth R. Fraser.
 Susa Young Gates.
 Annie Thompson Godbe.
 Augusta W. Grant.
 Elizabeth A. Hayward.
 Elizabeth Howard.
 Sarah M. Kimball.
 Hannah Lapish.
 Nellie Little.
 Alice Nesbitt.
 Anna T. Piercey.
 Mary Minnie Quay.
 Emily S. Richards.
 Lovern Robertson.
 Aurelia S. Rogers.
Lulu L. Shepard (Salt Lake City).
 Jane Skolfield.
 Bathsheba W. Smith.
 Eliza R. Snow.
 Minnie J. Snow.
 Emily W. Stevenson.
 Anstis Elmina Shepard Taylor.
 Elizabeth A. Taylor.
 Emmeline B. Wells.
 Florence L. Westcott.
 Seraph Young.
 Zina D. H. Young.
Zina P. Young Card.

Places 

 City and County Building.
 Council Hall.

Publications 

 Utah Woman Suffrage Song Book.
 The Woman's Exponent.

Suffragists campaigning in Utah 

 Susan B. Anthony.
 Carrie Chapman Catt.
 Clara Bewick Colby.
 Mary Garrett Hay.
 Elizabeth Lyle Saxon.
 Elizabeth Cady Stanton.

See also 

 Timeline of women's suffrage in Utah
 Women's suffrage in Utah
 Women's suffrage in the United States

References

Sources 

 
 

Utah suffrage

Utah suffragists
Activists from Utah
History of Utah
Suffragists